Walter Lowrie Hervey, Ph.D. (1862 – October 14, 1952) was an American educator born in Mount Vernon, Ohio.  He graduated from Princeton in 1886 (Ph.D., 1892).  He pursued teaching in New York City, particularly at Columbia.  In 1898 he became a member of the board of examiners of the department of education of New York City and he served there until he retired in 1932.

He edited the Horace Mann Readers, lectured and wrote articles on education, and was the author of:  
 Picture Work (1896)  
 Daily Lesson Plans (1912)  
 Introductory Second Reader (1914)

He had a son, Walter Bryant Hervey.

External links
 
 

1862 births
American book editors
Princeton University alumni
1952 deaths